The following elections occurred in the year 1937.

Asia
 1937 Philippine local elections
 1937 Iranian legislative election
 1937 Soviet Union legislative election

India
 1937 Indian provincial elections
 1937 Madras Presidency legislative assembly election
 1937 Madras Presidency Legislative Council election
 1937 Sind legislative assembly election

Europe
 1937 Irish general election and constitutional referendum 
 1937 Romanian general election
 1937 Soviet Union legislative election
 1937 Dutch general election
 1937 Luxembourg general election
 1937 Norwegian local elections

United Kingdom
 1937 Buckingham by-election
 1937 Cheltenham by-election
 1937 Glasgow Springburn by-election
 1937 Holland with Boston by-election
 1937 Islington North by-election

United Kingdom local

English local
 1937 Bermondsey Borough election
 1937 Southwark Borough election

North America

Canada
 1937 British Columbia general election
 1937 Edmonton municipal election
 1937 Nova Scotia general election
 1937 Ontario general election
 1937 Ottawa municipal election
 1937 Toronto municipal election
 1937 Yukon general election

United States
 1937 New York state election
 1937 Pittsburgh mayoral election

South America 
 1937 Argentine presidential election

Oceania

Australia
 1937 Australian federal election
 1937 Australian referendum
 1937 Tasmanian state election

See also
 :Category:1937 elections

1937
Elections